Henry Torrès (17 October 1891 – 4 January 1966) was a French trial lawyer and politician, and a prolific writer on political and legal matters.

Family
Henry Torrès was born in Les Andelys in 1891 to a Jewish family. His grandfather, Isaiah Levaillant, founded the League for the Defense of Human and Civil Rights during the Dreyfus Affair. He married Jeanne Levylier, with whom he had two children Jean and Georges, but they divorced.

Career
As a young man, Torrès became an active Communist and worked as a journalist for various socialist publications. During the First World War, he served as an infantry sergeant, was injured at Verdun and won several medals including the Croix de Guerre. After the war Torrès decided to study law and became a criminal lawyer. With Vincent de Moro-Giafferi and César Campinchi he was known as one of the "three Musketeers"—all brilliant young leaders of the Paris bar. In his early years Torrès had aspired to become a comedian, but his style was encumbered by a pronounced lisp. Nonetheless, in his later years he was famed for his booming voice and flamboyant personality.

Torrès was involved in several criminal trials, before the Schwartzbard trial, not only in Paris but in Moscow and in Rumania. Upon returning to Paris he initiated a protest campaign denouncing the barbaric treatment of Jews in Bessarabia. After the Schwartzbard trial he was recognized as one of France's leading trial lawyers and remained active in political affairs.

After the Nazi invasion of France, Torrès fled to South America, but was expelled first from Uruguay and then from Brazil because of his leftist associations. He moved on to Canada and then the United States. While in America, he campaigned against the Vichy regime and supported Charles de Gaulle. As a Jew, he had been banned from the French bar and because of his anti-government pamphlets and books he was condemned to death by the Pétain regime.

Writer
In New York City, Torrès served as editor-in-chief of La Voix de France, a political journal for refugees and later as a professor of law at the Universities of Rio de Janeiro and São Paulo. After the war, he returned to his homeland and was reinstated into the French bar.

From 1948 to 1958 he was a Gaullist senator for the Seine department.
He served briefly as Vice President of the High Court of Justice and did work in the national radio and television system, serving as President of the state monopoly from 1948 to 1959.

Torrès was a prolific writer and also wrote plays with a legal background including French translations of The Trial of Mary Dugan and Witness for the Prosecution. Henry Torrès died at his Paris home in 1966. He was 75.

References

Further reading
Jean-Denis Bredin, The Affair: The Case of Alfred Dreyfus (1986)
Eric Cahm, The Dreyfus Affair in French Society and Politics (1996)
Guy Chapman, The Dreyfus Trials (1972)
Nicholas Halasz, Captain Dreyfus: The Story of a Mass Hysteria (1955)
Michael Burns, France and the Dreyfus Affair: A Documentary History (1999)
David Levering Lewis, Prisoners of Honor, the Dreyfus Affair (1994), Henry Holt and Co, 
The Hon Justice Michael Kirby AC CMG, The Dreyfus Case a Century On - Ten Lessons for Ireland & Australia (PDF)

1891 births
1966 deaths
People from Eure
Politicians from Normandy
19th-century French Jews
Jewish French politicians
French Section of the Workers' International politicians
French Communist Party politicians
Socialist-Communist Union politicians
Independent Left (France) politicians
Rally of the French People politicians
National Centre of Social Republicans politicians
Democratic Union of Labour politicians
Members of the 15th Chamber of Deputies of the French Third Republic
French Senators of the Fourth Republic
20th-century French lawyers
Burials at Père Lachaise Cemetery